Inés Duarte, secretaria is a Venezuelan telenovela produced by Venevisión in 1990 and written by Alicia Barrios as a free version of the telenovela Buenos días, Isabel written by Delia Fiallo. This telenovela lasted 238 episodes and was distributed internationally by Venevisión International.

Amanda Gutierrez and Víctor Cámara starred as the main protagonists with  Rebeca Costoya as the main antagonist.

Synopsis
Ines Duarte is the kind of secretary that every executive dreams of: efficient, intelligent, dedicated and dependable. As a woman, however, Ines is mousy, drab and insignificant. The victim of an overbearing, overprotective mother, she has grown up with very low self-esteem and little interest in making herself attractive to men. For her boss, Andres Martan, a young millionaire in charge of a giant corporation, Ines is an indispensable employee but nothing more. A bitter and selfish widower with three children, Andres is too busy dealing with personal and professional problems to notice that Ines's loyalty is in reality a deep secret love, and that making him happy is her only goal in life. To achieve this goal, Ines must endure many ordeals and injustices.... and experiences an astonishing metamorphosis that will, finally, make her the woman Andres truly wants. Emotion, suspense, exciting plot twists and unexpected events make the story of Ines Duarte, Secretaria, an unforgettable one. Its excellent production and outstanding cast are guaranteed to turn this successful Venezuelan novel into an instant international hit.

Cast

Amanda Gutierrez as Inés Duarte
Víctor Cámara as Andrés Martán
Mariano Alvarez as Carlos Javier Martán
Rebeca Costoya as Raquel Mendivle
Carolina Lopez as Laura Campeche
Eva Blanco as Regina Duarte
Chony Fuentes as Lucrecia Martán
Agustina Martin as Victoria Martán
Judith Vasquez as Samantha Campeche
Helianta Cruz as Virginia Duarte
Mauricio Gonzalez as Santiago Luján
Luis Gerardo Nuñez as Roberto Suárez
Sandra Juhasz as Zuleica Torres
Barbara Mosquera as Amelia Ferro
Viviana Saez as Viviana
Andreina Sanchez as Adriana Siver
Juan Carlos Vivas as Andres "Junior" Martán
Rossana Termini as Elisa Martán
Asdrubal Blanco as David Martán
Veruska Garcia as Laurita Martán
Ricardo Garcia as Cornelio
Aidita Artigas as Tomasa
Chumico Romero
Marcelo Rodriguez as Nico
Carolina Cristancho
Nancy Gonzalez as Agustina Termini
Luis Malave as Hermes
Marco A. Casanova as Anibal
Ricardo Blanco
Henry Salvat
Jenifer Dinisio as Diana
Yelitza Hernandez as Sonia
Rafael Romero 
Elizabeth Morales as Anais
Carolina Perdigon as Maria Lucia
Maria Elena Heredia as Nela

Versions
 Amor Secreto (2015):starring Alejandra Sandoval, Miguel de León, Juan Carlos García, and Alexandra Braun.

References

External links

1991 telenovelas
Venevisión telenovelas
1991 Venezuelan television series debuts
1991 Venezuelan television series endings
Venezuelan telenovelas
Spanish-language telenovelas
Television shows set in Caracas